6500 series may refer to:

Japanese train types 

 Meitetsu 6500 series electric multiple unit operating for Nagoya Railroad
 Shintetsu 6500 series electric multiple unit operating for Kobe Electric Railway (Shinetsu)
 Toei 6500 series electric multiple unit operating for Toei Transportation

Electric multiple units of Japan
Disambiguation pages